Ardath is an unincorporated community in the west-central region of Saskatchewan located on Highway 654, along the Canadian National Railway, Delisle-Tichfield Junction stub. Its most notable buildings are a curling rink and a brick United Church.

History 
Prior to December 31, 1972, Ardath was a village, but it was restructured as an unincorporated community on that date. Ardath took its name from the British novel Ardath: The Story of a Dead Self by Marie Corelli . Both the Ardath United Church and the town hall were built in 1912. Ardath's decline began after a series of bizarre events, starting in 1919 when a train crashed through one of the village's grain elevators killing three people.

"But at 10:15 a.m. on March 24, 1919 things began to go horribly wrong at Ardath. A southbound passenger train took to the switch track at high speed and slammed through the first of four grain elevators at Ardath. The elevator agent had just left the office, and was at the station to put his mail on the train. All that remained of his office was his chair. When the train came to a crashing halt it was buried in grain.Three  people were killed in the accident; the locomotive fireman, the engineer, and a passenger."

A few years later, a fire destroyed most of main street resulting in a large scale exodus from the community of many of the community's 150 residents. In 1931, a man murdered another man believing him to be someone else and then burned down a house, the culminating event that contributed to Ardath's eventual decline.

HMCS Margaret Brooke 
Margaret was singled out for the honour due to the bravery that she exhibited on the night of October 13, 1942 in a wartime naval incident involving the sinking of the ferry  by a German U-boat during the Battle of the St. Lawrence during the Second World War.

Economy 
Agriculture is the top employment field with many surrounding farms and ranches.

Education 
Ardath no longer has a school, but those who live in Ardath are sent to the neighboring town of Outlook which has a school that covers Kindergarten to Grade 12 serving students.

See also 
 List of communities in Saskatchewan

References 

Fertile Valley No. 285, Saskatchewan
Former villages in Saskatchewan
Ghost towns in Saskatchewan
Unincorporated communities in Saskatchewan
Populated places disestablished in 1972